

Portugal
 Angola – 
 António de Saldanha da Gama, Governor of Angola (1807–1810)
 José de Oliveira Barbosa, Governor of Angola (1810–1816)
 Macau –
 Lucas Jose de Alvarenga, Governor of Macau (1808–1810)
 Bernardo Aleixo de Lemos e Faria, Governor of Macau (1810–1814)

Spanish Empire
Viceroyalty of New Granada – 
Antonio José Amar y Borbón Arguedas, Viceroy of New Granada (1803–1810)
Francisco Javier Venegas, marqués de la Reunión y de Nueva España, Viceroy of New Granada (1810)
Viceroyalty of New Spain – 
Francisco Javier de Lizana y Beaumont, Viceroy of New Spain (1809–1810)
Pedro Catani, Viceroy of New Spain (1810)
Francisco Javier Venegas, 1st Marquess of Reunión and New Spain, Viceroy of New Spain (1810–1813)
Captaincy General of Cuba – Salvador José de Muro, 2nd Marquis of Someruelos, Governor of Cuba (1799–1812)
Spanish East Indies – 
Mariano Fernández de Folgueras, Governor-General of the Philippines (1806–1810)
Manuel Gonzalez de Aguilar, Governor-General of the Philippines (1810–1813)
Commandancy General of the Provincias Internas – Nemesio Salcedo y Salcedo (1802–1813)
Viceroyalty of Peru – José Fernando Abascal y Sousa, marqués de la Concordia, Viceroy of Peru (1806–1816)
Captaincy General of Chile – 
Francisco Antonio García Carrasco Díaz, Governor and Captain-General of Chile (1808–1810)
Mateo de Toro Zambrano, 1st Count of la Conquista, Governor and Captain-General of Chile (1810)
Viceroyalty of the Río de la Plata – Baltasar Hidalgo de Cisneros, Viceroy of the Río de la Plata (1809–1810)

United Kingdom
 Cayman Islands – William Bodden, Chief Magistrate of the Cayman Islands (1776–1823)
 Malta Protectorate – Hildebrand Oakes, Civil Commissioner of Malta (1810–1813)
 New South Wales – Lachlan Macquarie, Governor of New South Wales (1810–1821)

Colonial governors
Colonial governors
1810